Platanthera lacera is an orchid in the genus Platanthera, native throughout Eastern United States and Canada. It occurs in a variety of habitats ranging from “mesic and dry-mesic sand prairie, wet sedge meadow, calcareous fen, sphagnum bog, acid seep spring, dry field, mesic flatwoods, and mesic upland forests.”
Common names include ragged fringed orchid  and green fringed orchid.

Identification 

Pollination 
The flowers are fragrant at night and are pollinated by crepuscular moths.

References 

Orchids of the United States
lacera